In geology, a platform is a continental area covered by relatively flat or gently tilted, mainly sedimentary strata, which overlie a basement of consolidated igneous or metamorphic rocks of an earlier deformation. Platforms, shields and the basement rocks together constitute cratons. Platform sediments can be classified into the following groups: a "protoplatform" of metamorphosed sediments at the bottom, a "quasiplatform" of slightly deformed sediments, a "cataplatform", and an "orthoplatform" at the top. The Mesoproterozoic Jotnian sediments of the  Baltic area are examples of a "quasiplatform". The post-Ordovician rocks of the South American Platform are examples of an orthoplatform.

See also
Carbonate platform
East European Platform
List of shields and cratons

References

Cratons
Plate tectonics